The Netherlands Football League Championship 1891–1892 was contested by six teams from the cities Amsterdam, The Hague, Haarlem and Rotterdam. The teams participated in the competition that would later be called Eerste Klasse West. But since the western football district of the Netherlands was the only one to have a competition at the time, it could be regarded as a national championship. RAP won the championship.

New entrants
Victoria Rotterdam
VVA returned after one season of absence
RC en VV Rotterdam was the result of a merger between last seasons competitors Olympia Rotterdam and Concordia

League standings

References
RSSSF Eerste Klasse West
RSSSF Netherlands Football League Championships 1898-1954

Netherlands Football League Championship seasons